Small acidic protein is a protein that in humans is encoded by the SMAP gene.

References

Further reading

Uncharacterized proteins
Genes on human chromosome 11